Paramore Hill is an unincorporated community in Jenkins County, in the U.S. state of Georgia.

History
Paramore was the name of an early settler. A variant name was "Paramore". A post office called Parramore Hill was established in 1868, the name was changed to Parramore in 1881, and the post office closed in 1900.

References

Unincorporated communities in Jenkins County, Georgia
Unincorporated communities in Georgia (U.S. state)